Holdhus is a village in Bjørnafjorden municipality in Vestland county, Norway. The village was the administrative centre of the old municipality of Hålandsdal which existed from 1903 until 1964. The historic Holdhus Church is located in the village. The village is located near several large lakes including Gjønavatnet, Henangervatnet, and Skogseidvatnet.

References

Villages in Vestland
Bjørnafjorden